Funky Entertainment is the third and final album by the Detroit, Michigan R&B group Brainstorm. It was released in 1979 on Tabu Records and produced by Jerry Peters.

Track listing
"Hot for You" - (Trenita Womack, Belita Woods)  10:48
"A Case of the Boogie" - (Sam Dees)  9:05
"Popcorn" - (Jeryl Bright, Deon Estus, Renell Gonsalves, Gerald Kent, Charles Overton, Larry Sims, Trenita Womack, Belita Woods, William L. Wooten III)  4:46
"Funky Entertainment" - (Gerald Kent, Charles Overton, Belita Woods)  4:12
"You Put a Charge in My Life" - (Lynn Mack, Jerry Peters)  4:10
"Don't Let Me Catch You With Your Groove Down" - (Renell Gonsalves)  4:42

Personnel
Belita Woods - lead vocals, backing vocals
Trenita Womack - lead vocals, backing vocals, percussion, flute, piano, arrangements
Greg Poree, Joe O'Doherty, Phil Upchurch - guitar
Paul Jackson Jr. - guitar, sitar
Deon Estus - bass
Jerry Peters - keyboards, backing vocals, arrangements, conductor
William L. Wooten III - keyboards
Charles Overton - saxophone, backing vocals, arrangements
Harvey Mason - drums
Renell Gonsalves - drums, arrangements
Stephanie Spruill - percussion
Ernie Watts, Fred Jackson, Jr. - saxophone
Jay DaVersa, Jerry Hey, Kenny Mason, Oscar Brashear - trumpet
George Bohanon, Maurice Spears - trombone
Larry Sims - horns
Gwen Matthews, Jim Gilstrap, Syreeta Wright - backing vocals
Ray Kelley, Nils Oliver, Paula Hochhalter, Ronald Cooper - cello

Charts

Singles

References

External links
 Brainstorm-Funky Entertainment at Discogs

1979 albums
Albums produced by Jerry Peters
Tabu Records albums